Maszewo Duże  is a village in the administrative district of Gmina Stara Biała, within Płock County, Masovian Voivodeship, in east-central Poland.

The village has a population of 1,400.

References

Villages in Płock County